Adeimantus of Corinth, son of Ocytus (Ὠκύτος), was the Corinthian commander during the invasion of Greece by Xerxes.   Before the Battle of Artemisium (480 BC) he threatened to sail away. 

According to Suda, when Adeimantus called Themistocles a city-less man before the Battle of Salamis (because the Persians had destroyed Athens), the Themistocles responded: "Who is city-less, when he has 200 triremes?"

According to the Athenians he took to flight at the very commencement of the battle, but this was denied by the Corinthians and the other Greeks.

Adeimantus' son Aristeus was the Corinthian commander at the Battle of Potidaea in 432 BC.

References 

Ancient Corinthians
5th-century BC Greek people
Battle of Salamis
Battle of Artemisium
Soldiers of ancient Corinth
Greek people of the Greco-Persian Wars
Ancient Greek generals